Adam Terrence Kunkel (born December 9, 1999) is an American college basketball player for the Xavier Musketeers of the Big East Conference. He previously played for the Belmont Bruins.

High school career
Kunkel attended Randall K. Cooper High School. As a junior, he helped his team reach the Sweet 16 title game, scoring 13 points in the loss against Bowling Green High School. Kunkel averaged 16.3 points and 3.9 rebounds per game, shooting 41 percent from three-point range. He earned Kentucky Region IX Player of the Year, Third Team Kentucky All-State, and Lexington Catholic Tournament Most Valuable Player honors. Kunkel averaged 20 points and 7.7 rebounds per game as a senior, shooting 45 percent from behind the arc. He was named First Team All-State, Kentucky Region IX Player of the Year, and was a finalist for Kentucky Mr. Basketball. Kunkel committed to Belmont in November 2017, choosing the Bruins over offers from Central Arkansas, Samford and Winthrop.

College career
Kunkel expected to redshirt his freshman season at Belmont to put on weight, but instead became a rotation player. As a freshman, he averaged 2.3 points in 9.3 minutes per game. On November 16, 2019, Kunkel scored a career-high 35 points in a 100–85 win against Boston College in the Gotham Classic. As a sophomore, Kunkel averaged 16.5 points, 2.6 assists and 2.8 rebounds per game, shooting 39 percent from three-point from behind the arc. He earned First-Team All-Ohio Valley Conference honors. Kunkel's increase in his scoring average of 14.2 points per game was the second highest in Division I. Following the season, he entered the transfer portal. On July 25, Kunkel committed to Xavier over Arkansas, Creighton and Oklahoma. He was granted a waiver for immediate eligibility on December 5. Kunkel averaged 7 points and 1.6 assists per game as a junior.

Career statistics

College

|-
| style="text-align:left;"| 2018–19
| style="text-align:left;"| Belmont
| 25 || 0 || 9.3 || .321 || .275 || .867 || .6 || .7 || .4 || .1 || 2.3
|-
| style="text-align:left;"| 2019–20
| style="text-align:left;"| Belmont
| 33 || 33 || 29.8 || .433 || .390 || .821 || 2.8 || 2.6 || .9 || .2 || 16.5
|-
| style="text-align:left;"| 2020–21
| style="text-align:left;"| Xavier
| 16 || 4 || 18.8 || .398 || .265 || .889 || 1.3 || 1.6 || 1.0 || .2 || 7.0
|- class="sortbottom"
| style="text-align:center;" colspan="2"| Career
| 74 || 37 || 20.5 || .417 || .349 || .831 || 1.7 || 1.8 || .8 || .2 || 9.7

References

External links
Xavier Musketeers bio
Belmont Bruins bio

1999 births
Living people
American men's basketball players
Basketball players from Kentucky
Belmont Bruins men's basketball players
People from Kenton County, Kentucky
Shooting guards
Xavier Musketeers men's basketball players